A Perfect Place is a black-and-white tragic comedy short directed, produced, and written by Derrick Scocchera starring Mark Boone Junior and Bill Moseley, first released on 2 February 2008 at the Lake County Film Festival. It was filmed in entirely  in Alameda, Oakland and San Francisco, California under a budget of $50,000.

Cast
Mark Boone Junior –	Tom
Bill Moseley –		Eddie
Todd Lookinland –		The Cheat
Isabelle Maynard –		Mrs. Newburg
Tom Miller –			Dennis
Peter De Luca –		Mr. Newburg

Soundtrack

The soundtrack comprises the third non-aliased solo release by Mike Patton, who wrote, produced and performed all tracks (with the exception of some percussion parts), released on March 11, 2008 under his own Ipecac Recordings with special edition copies of the album being released with a bonus DVD containing the film. The score itself is 10 minutes longer than the film because Patton "got excited" and has been well received by critics with allmusic giving it a four out of five star rating and crediting Patton for the "depth of his orchestral arrangements" calling them "surprisingly mature".

Track listing
All tracks written by Mike Patton except some percussion parts as noted here.
 "Main Title" – 3:15
 "A Perfect Place" – 3:30
 "Car Radio (AM)" – 1:01
 "A Perfect Twist (Vocal)" – 2:44
 "A Little Poker Tomorrow Night?" – 3:10
 "Seriously Disturbed" – 1:18
 "A Dream of Roses" – 2:34
 "A Perfect Place/Main Title (Reprise)" – 2:45
 "Batucada" – 2:18
 "Another Perfect Place" – 1:42
 "Car Radio (FM)" – 1:55
 "Swinging the Body" – 1:57
 "Catholic Tribe" – 2:28
 "Il Cupo Dolore" – 2:06
 "A Perfect End" – 2:46

Personnel
Mike Patton –	percussion, producer, mixing, musician
Danny Heifetz, William Winant –	percussion on tracks 1 and 9
Gavin Lurssen –	mastering

Footnotes

External links
 
 

Mike Patton albums
Comedy-drama film soundtracks
2008 soundtrack albums
Ipecac Recordings soundtracks
2000s English-language films